Heubach Telecommunication Tower is a 162 metre tall telecommunication tower of Deutsche Telekom AG on Glasenberg at Heubach in Baden-Württemberg. It is used for directional radio, mobile radio, police and fire brigade radio also used for FM- and TV transmission.

Heubach Telecommunication Tower is equipped with an observation deck in a height of 25 metres, which is accessible for tourists by a stairway with 139 steps. However this observation deck is only open at rare occasions.

Radiated FM- and TV-programmes

See also
 List of towers

External links
 
 http://skyscraperpage.com/diagrams/?b20219

Towers completed in 2009
Observation towers in Baden-Württemberg
Communication towers in Germany
2009 establishments in Germany